Richard Lang (born 23 February 1989 in Sydney) is an Australian former professional cyclist.

Major results

2009
 1st  Omnium, National Track Championships
 1st Goulburn to Sydney Classic
 1st Stage 4 Tour of Gippsland
 1st Stage 2 Tour of Geelong
 1st Stage 5 Tour of Tasmania
 3rd Overall Tour of the Murray River
1st Stage 6
 3rd Overall Tour de Perth
1st Stage 1 
2010
 1st Stage 1 (TTT) Tour of Thuringia
 1st Stage 5 Tour of Tasmania
2011
 1st Overall UCI Oceania Tour
 1st  Road race, Oceania Under-23 Road Championships
 1st Trofeo Banca Popolare di Vicenza

References

External links

1989 births
Living people
Australian male cyclists